is a Japanese manga series written and illustrated by NON. It was serialized in Shueisha's seinen manga magazine Grand Jump from March 2020 to June 2021, with its chapters collected in three tankōbon volumes.

Publication
Shueisha collected its chapters in three tankōbon volumes, released from August 19, 2020, to July 16, 2021.

Volume list

See also
Delivery Cinderella, another manga series by the same author
Harem Marriage, another manga series by the same author

References

Further reading

External links
 

Seinen manga
Shueisha manga
Suspense anime and manga